U.S. Route 79 (US 79) in Tennessee enters the state from Arkansas via the Memphis & Arkansas Bridge in Memphis, and runs northeast through western and the northwestern portions of middle Tennessee, and leaving the state into Kentucky northeast of Clarksville. Along the route, US 79 is accompanied with several concurrencies, including hidden designations, throughout its alignment in Tennessee.

Route description

Memphis to Brownsville
From I-55, US 79 continues to follow US 61/64/70 (SR 1) on E.H. Crump Boulevard. US 64/70/79 then turns north onto Danny Thomas Boulevard northward, then it makes a right turn onto Union Avenue, where US 51 (SR 3) gets involved in the concurrency until Bellevue Boulevard. US 64/70/79 then joins SR 277 northward until the U.S. routes turn onto Summer Avenue eastward. US 64 splits from US 70/79 at their intersection with SR !5 in Bartlett, in northeastern Shelby County.

US 79 continues to run concurrently with US 70 (SR 1) from here until Brownsville, in Haywood County. In Brownsville, US 70/79 joins the Ah Gray/C.A. Rawls Bypass with SR 19. The intersection with Anderson Avenue marks the beginning of US 79's long concurrency with SR 76, while the overlaps with SR 19 and US 70/SR 1 both end at the intersections with Jefferson Street and East Main Street, respectively. US 79/SR 76 begins a concurrency with US 70A at that point.

Brownsville to Paris Landing 
US 79/70A (SR 76) continues northeastward to have major junctions with US 412, US 45W and US 45E in the towns of Bells, Humboldt, and Milan, respectively. US 70A becomes a standalone route in Atwood. US 79 continues northeast to McKenzie and Paris. US 79 is the main thoroughfare accessing Paris Landing State Park before crossing the Tennessee River.

Tennessee River to Kentucky state line  
After entering Stewart County, US 79 becomes known as Donelson Parkway, and forms a portion of the southern boundary of the Land Between the Lakes National Recreation Area before entering Dover, where it crosses the Cumberland River, and then continues eastward to Clarksville. It then becomes known as Dover Road between the Stewart-Montgomery County line and the city of Clarksville.

US 79 then runs concurrently with US 41A on the northwestern side of Clarksville, and it then turns left to bypass the downtown area, while beginning its concurrency with SR 13 for the remainder of its path to the Kentucky state line. Wilma Rudolph Boulevard is the name given to the portion of U.S. Route 79 between the Red River (Lynnwood-Tarpley) bridge near the Kraft Street intersection and I-24’s exit 4 interchange. This section of Highway 79 in Clarksville was previously called the Guthrie Highway, for nearby Guthrie, Kentucky, but in 1994, the name was changed to honor Wilma Rudolph, an Olympic runner from Clarksville, who won three gold medals in the 1960 Rome Summer Olympic Games in Italy.

The highway then enters Todd County, Kentucky after exiting the city of Clarksville. The state line coincides with the northern terminus of SR 13.

Concurrency list 
U.S. 79 runs concurrently with the following interstate and U.S. routes: 
I-55/US 61/US 64 from Arkansas state line to Exit 12, 
US 70 from Arkansas state line to Brownsville 
US 51 in downtown Memphis 
US 70A from Brownsville to Atwood, and
US 41A (Providence Blvd.) from west Clarksville to downtown Clarksville

Additionally, all areas of US 79 run concurrently with Tennessee state routes throughout its course through the state as “hidden,” or secret designations as the state routes are not signed. They include: 
 from Memphis to Brownsville (in association with US 70)
 in downtown Memphis (in association with US 51) 
 from Braden to Mason 
 from Brownsville to Clarksville 
 from Milan to Atwood
 in Clarksville (in association with US 41A) 
 through Clarksville 
 from downtown Clarksville to the Kentucky state line

History 
US 79 did not have any presence in Tennessee or southern Kentucky until it was routed into the state in 1944. Until then, the route ended in West Memphis, Arkansas, and US 79's current route in Tennessee was signed solely as SR 76 from Brownsville to Clarksville, and SR 13 from Clarksville to the Kentucky line.

Major intersections 
The mileposts listed in the following table is only an estimated calculation. Actual mile markers may vary and subject to change due to any future reroutings that may occur

See also 
 
Tennessee State Route 1 
Tennessee State Route 76

References 

 Tennessee
079
Transportation in Shelby County, Tennessee
Transportation in Fayette County, Tennessee
Transportation in Tipton County, Tennessee
Transportation in Haywood County, Tennessee
Transportation in Gibson County, Tennessee
Transportation in Carroll County, Tennessee
Transportation in Henry County, Tennessee
Transportation in Stewart County, Tennessee
Transportation in Montgomery County, Tennessee
Transportation in Clarksville, Tennessee
Transportation in Memphis, Tennessee